Wieniawski may refer to:

 Henryk Wieniawski (1835–1880), Polish violinist and composer
 Józef Wieniawski (1837–1912), Polish pianist, composer, conductor and teacher